Blaž Kavčič was the defending champion, but elected not to defend his title.
Hyeon Chung clinched his maiden ATP Challenger Tour title, beating Jordan Thompson 7–6(7–0), 6–4 in the final.

Seeds

Draw

Finals

Top half

Bottom half

References
 Main Draw
 Qualifying Draw

Singles
Chang-Sat Bangkok Open - Singles
 in Thai tennis